Events in the year 1961 in Nigeria.

Incumbents
Monarch: Queen Elizabeth II
Governor-General: Nnamdi Azikiwe 
Prime Minister: Abubakar Tafawa Balewa
 Senate President: Dennis Osadebay
 House Speaker: Ibrahim Jalo Waziri
 Chief Justice: Adetokunbo Ademola

Politics
February 1961 - British Cameroons referendum
June 1, 1961 - southern Cameroon became a Province within Northern Nigeria.
October 1961 - Northern Cameroon dissociated from Nigeria.

References

 
1960s in Nigeria